The Calar Alto Observatory (Centro Astronómico Hispano en Andalucía or "Spanish Astronomical Centre in Andalusia") is an astronomical observatory located in Almería province in Spain on Calar Alto, a  mountain in the Sierra de Los Filabres range.

Until 2018, Calar Alto was owned and operated jointly by the German Max Planck Institute for Astronomy in Heidelberg, and the Spanish Institute of Astrophysics of Andalusia (IAA-CSIC) in Granada. It was named the "German–Spanish Astronomical Centre" (in Spanish, Centro Astronómico Hispano-Alemán (CAHA); in German, Deutsch-Spanisches Astronomisches Zentrum). In 2019, the Council of Andalusia takes over the German partner, sharing the observatory with the Spanish National Research Council through its head institute, IAA-CSIC.

Calar Alto telescopes are used for a broad range of observations, from objects in the Solar System to cosmology (the Alhambra and CALIFA surveys), including the search for exoplanets (the CARMENES survey).

The 3.5-meter telescope is the largest telescope in mainland Europe, though there are three larger telescopes on the Spanish island of La Palma at the Roque de los Muchachos Observatory. The minor planet 189202 Calar Alto, discovered by Felix Hormuth at Starkenburg Observatory in 2003, was named in honor of the observatory site.

History 

The site was proposed in 1970, and was officially opened in July 1975 with the commissioning of its  telescope. The site developed thanks to German and Spanish cooperation in astronomy. Eventually, four more telescopes were commissioned. The Schmidt telescope was moved to Calar Alto in 1976 from the Hamburg Observatory at Bergedorf, where it had been completed in 1954. The observatory hosted the finish of Stage 11 of the 2017 Vuelta a España cycling race (the stage was won by Miguel Ángel López), having previously hosted stage finishes in 2004 (won by eventual race champion Roberto Heras) and 2006 (won by Igor Antón).
Calar Alto was climbed on Stage 9 of the Vuelta (AUG 2021).

Equipment 

The 3.5-meter is the largest telescope on European soil with an equatorial mount.
There is also a  telescope that is owned and operated by the Spanish National Observatory and a robotic telescope operated by the Spanish Astrobiology Center (CAB).

Work

CALIFA survey 

The CALIFA survey (Calar Alto Legacy Integral Field Area survey) is an astronomical project to map 600 galaxies with imaging spectroscopy (integral field spectroscopy (IFS)).

CARMENES survey 

The CARMENES survey (Calar Alto high-Resolution search for M-dwarfs with Exoearths with Near-infrared and optical Échelle Spectrographs) is a project to examine approximately 300 M-dwarf stars for signs of exoplanets with the CARMENES instrument on Calar Alto's 3.5m telescope. Operating since 2016, it aims to find Earth-sized exoplanets around 2  (Earth masses) using Doppler spectroscopy (also called the radial velocity method).

List of discovered minor planets 

Close to a hundred minor planets have been discovered at Calar Alto by astronomers Luboš Kohoutek, Kurt Birkle, Ulrich Hopp, Johann Baur, Krisztián Sárneczky, Gyula Szabó, Felix Hormuth and Hermann Boehnhardt. In addition, the Minor Planet Center, directly credits "Calar Alto" with the discovery of the following minor planets:

Publications

See also 
 List of largest optical reflecting telescopes
 List of largest optical telescopes in the 20th century
 Cerro Tololo Inter-American Observatory
 La Silla Observatory
 List of minor planet discoverers
 Llano de Chajnantor Observatory
 Paranal Observatory
 Very Large Telescope

References

External links 
 Calar Alto: Darkness In The Infrared ScienceDaily (Jan. 30, 2009)
 Carta de apoyo del Observatorio de Calar-Alto of April 2013
 bird's eye view

Astronomical observatories in Spain
Buildings and structures in Andalusia

Minor-planet discovering observatories